Angela White (22 March 1974) is an Australian athlete. She participated in the 1995 IAAF World Cross Country Championships and also the 1990 World Junior Championships in Athletics.

References

1974 births
Living people
Australian female long-distance runners
20th-century Australian women
21st-century Australian women